Buenos Aires, the capital of Argentina, has a temperate climate, which is classified as a humid subtropical climate (Cfa) under the Köppen climate classification with four distinct seasons. Summers are hot and humid with frequent thunderstorms while winters are cool and drier with frosts that occurs on average twice per year. Spring and fall are transition seasons characterized by changeable weather.

Different climatic factors influence the climate of Buenos Aires. The semi–permanent South Atlantic High influences its climate throughout the year by bringing in moist winds from the northeast, which bring most of the precipitation to the city in the form of frontal systems during winter or storms produced by cyclogenesis in autumn and winter. The hot temperatures and high insolation in the summer months form a low pressure system called the Chaco Low over northern Argentina, generating a pressure gradient that brings moist easterly winds to the city – because of this, summer is the rainiest season. In contrast, this low pressure system weakens in the winter, which combined with strong southerly winds results in a drier season due to weaker easterly winds. Being located in the Pampas, Buenos Aires has variable weather due to the passage of contrasting air mass – the cold, dry Pampero from the south and warm, humid tropical air from the north. The coastal location results in a strong maritime influence, causing extreme temperatures (hot or cold) to be rare.

General climatology

Buenos Aires is located in the humid subtropical climate zone (Köppen climate classification: Cfa). Due to the maritime influences from the adjoining Atlantic Ocean, its climate is temperate with extreme temperatures (both hot and cold) being rare. Thus, cold air coming directly from the south are moderated by the Atlantic Ocean and warmer than winds from the southwest (which are not moderated by it).

The climate of Buenos Aires is dominated by the semi–permanent South Atlantic High throughout the year. This brings in moist winds from the northeast, which brings most of the precipitation to the city. During winter, it brings in frontal systems responsible for precipitation in the city. In autumn and summer, it produces thunderstorms that are generally located north of the city and produces strong winds from the south or southeast that can occasionally lead to the swelling of the Río de la Plata, flooding coastal areas. The South Pacific High is the origin of polar air masses that are responsible for the coldest temperatures and result in clear and very dry conditions. These air masses originate from the South Pacific high and move in a northeastern direction during winter towards Buenos Aires. Although it is polar maritime (this is a cool, moist air mass that forms from oceans located in the sub-Antarctic and Antarctic regions at the southern tip of South America), it becomes modified as it passes over the South American continent, becoming drier as it arrives at Buenos Aires. This is because as the cold air masses from the South Pacific High move over the Pacific Ocean and the Andes and reach the land south of 35oS (where the Andes not as high), anticyclogenesis leads to the formation of a strong high pressure system in the center of the country (at around 40oS). This high pressure system brings cold and dry, polar continental air masses to Buenos Aires. Cold fronts are more common during winter than in summer as the South Atlantic and South Pacific highs are at their southernmost positions during summer, making it difficult for cold fronts to enter.

The city is located in an area in which the Pampero and the Sudestada winds pass by. Being located in the Pampas, the weather is variable due to the contrasting air masses and frontal storms. The Pampero wind brings in cold, dry air from the south while warm humid tropical air produces sultry nortes (a gentle wind usually from the northeast formed by trade winds and the South Atlantic High that brings cloudy, hot, and humid weather and is responsible for bringing heat waves). Often, the passage of the Pampero winds occurs as a cold front passes through, leading to strong gusts from the south or southeast, a decrease in humidity and temperature, and an increase in the atmospheric pressure. When the cold Pampero winds meet with warm humid air from the north, thunderstorms are produced. The Sudestada winds are formed when a high pressure system located in southern Argentina interacts with a low pressure system over Uruguay and southern Brazil. When Sudestadas form, they bring long periods of precipitation, cloudy weather and cooler temperatures. These are common during the winter months. Because the Sudestada brings the highest wind speeds (particularly when these winds are combined with the astronomical tides), the Sudestada is responsible for floods that occur in low-lying areas. Flooding impacts the neighbourhoods La Boca and Barracas which are in the southern parts of the city, more low-lying and inhabited by poor people (of low socioeconomic status).

The urban heat island makes the city warmer than suburban and rural areas. On average, Buenos Aires is warmer than the surrounding areas by  owing to the urban heat island. The average heat island is smaller in summer than in winter, with summer maximum temperatures being roughly the same than in suburban areas, but minimum temperatures being higher, while in winter, both maximum and minimum temperatures are higher in Buenos Aires city.

The El Niño–Southern Oscillation is a major factor in the variation of annual precipitation within Buenos Aires and the Pampas, particularly during spring and summer. During an El Niño year, precipitation is higher, with a significant increase in precipitation from November to January. In contrast, La Niña years are associated with lower precipitation; precipitation is below average during October–December.

Seasonal weather

Spring

Springs in Buenos Aires are typically mild during the day with cool to cold nights. It is one of the rainiest seasons in the city, averaging  of precipitation and 28 days with measurable precipitation. Nonetheless, most precipitation events are short in duration.

Spring is characterized by changeable weather with temperatures that can fluctuate. Cold polar air from the south can bring cooler temperatures. The same polar air affected many parts of the country, bringing cold temperatures and snow in coastal parts of Patagonia. In some cases, heat waves, can occur, particularly in November.

Summer

Summers are hot and humid. On average, mornings and afternoons are hot whereas temperatures drop considerably at night. This is due to high temperatures and high insolation that lead to the development of a low pressure system called the Chaco Low situated over northern Argentina that interacts with the South Atlantic High to generate a pressure gradient that brings moist easterly winds to the region, favouring precipitation, which mostly occurs in the form of convective thunderstorms. The Chaco Low also interacts with the South Atlantic high to bring warm and tropical air from the north which is the strongest in summer when the Chaco Low is at its strongest due to higher insolation.

Heat waves are a common feature of summers in the city. These heat waves place extra demand on electricity usage, leading to shortages. In extreme cases, these power shortages during heat waves can cause traffic jams and protests, such as the ongoing 12-day March 2023 heat wave, the longest heat wave ever recorded in Buenos Aires However, most heat waves are  less than a week long, and are followed by the passage of the cold, dry Pampero wind, which brings violent and intense thunderstorms with strong gusts and hail followed by cooler temperatures and lower humidity. Occasionally, a tornado can form, which can strike the city; most tornadoes are relatively weak and rarely cause deaths. The greatest risk for tornadoes occurs in summer due to favourable conditions. These severe storms can damage cars, houses and disrupt public services such as transportation and collection and disposal of urban solid waste.

Autumn
At the beginning of autumn, temperatures are warm to hot in the afternoon while nights and mornings are mild. Later on in the season, conditions are cooler featuring mild afternoons, and cold nights and mornings. Periods of rainy weather occur although these are usually of short duration. Frosts rarely occur, though they can occur as early as May.

Winter

June to August are the winter months in Buenos Aires. Winters are cold with mild temperatures during the day and cold nights. Highs during the season average  while lows average . Lows rarely drop below , averaging 2 days each year at the central observatory, and 1 day at Aeroparque. Cold waves can occur in these months in which periods of cold temperatures can persist for days. These cold waves, particularly during severe winters lead to increases in energy demand, which can cause significant energy shortages. Snowfall occasionally occurs in the surrounding areas of the city but rarely within Buenos Aires proper; since the start of meteorological observations in 1906 at the central observatory, snowfall has only been observed thrice: June 1918, July 1928, and July 2007. This is due to the city center having higher temperatures than the surrounding areas owing to the urban heat island effect.

Most of the precipitation comes from frontal systems associated with cyclogenesis and strong southeasterly winds (Sudestada), which bring long periods of precipitation, cloudy weather and cooler temperatures. Winters are cloudy while relative humidity is very high, often 90% or higher, making the weather dull, grey and cool. Occasionally, warm air masses from the north bring warmer temperatures. These warm air masses can bring sunny weather, particularly during the afternoon when they come from the north or northwest as a result of a trough located in central Argentina. On the other hand, warm air masses from Brazil bring humid conditions, featuring high humidity with high cloud cover that is typical of a warm front of a frontal system and typical of tropical maritime air. These warm air masses that are responsible for the high humidity and cloud cover are the warmest air masses, leading to the warmest temperatures. Nonetheless, these are short lived as the Chaco Low, which is responsible for bringing in warm and tropical air from the north is weaker in winter due to lower insolation, leading to the winds from the north being less intense and shorter lived.

Towards the end of winter in August, there are important changes in the atmospheric circulation. Warm, humid air penetrates the city, higher solar radiation and frequent synoptic weather disturbances from the west occur during the end of the winter. As such, the end of winter is usually characterized by heavy storms with lightning. This is popularly known as the Santa Rosa Storm, around 30 August. Based on 111 years of weather observations (1906–2016) from the central observatory, 61 years (55% of the time) have seen stormy weather occurring on days close to 30 August, although not all of these have led to heavy precipitation.

Extremes

Temperature

Precipitation
The year with the maximum precipitation was 1900, when the city received  of precipitation. The highest precipitation for a single day was recorded on 27 February 1930, when  of precipitation fell.

Statistics

See also

 Climate of Argentina
 Climatic regions of Argentina
 Pampas

Notes

References

Books

External links
 Servicio Meteorológico Nacional 
 Climatic Characteristics of Buenos Aires 

Buenos Aires
Buenos Aires
Buenos Aires